Bernard de Fombelle (9 January 1924 – 14 July 1987) was a French equestrian. He competed at the 1956 Summer Olympics and the 1960 Summer Olympics.

References

1924 births
1987 deaths
French male equestrians
Olympic equestrians of France
Equestrians at the 1956 Summer Olympics
Equestrians at the 1960 Summer Olympics
Sportspeople from Limoges
20th-century French people